Gadyachsky Uyezd (Гадячский уезд) was one of the subdivisions of the Poltava Governorate of the Russian Empire. It was situated in the northeastern part of the governorate. Its administrative centre was Gadyach (Hadiach).

Demographics
At the time of the Russian Empire Census of 1897, Gadyachsky Uyezd had a population of 142,806. Of these, 96.9% spoke Ukrainian, 2.4% Yiddish, 0.6% Russian and 0.1% Polish as their native language.

References

 
Uezds of Poltava Governorate
Poltava Governorate